Floyd Anthony Raines (born April 14, 1964) is a retired American professional stock car racing driver. He is a former National Touring Series champion in the now defunct American Speed Association and 1999 Rookie of the Year in the NASCAR Nationwide Series. He most recently was the spotter for the #42 Chip Ganassi Racing Chevrolet Camaro ZL1 for Matt Kenseth.

Before NASCAR 
In 1988, Raines competed in five ASA races, and then returned for his rookie year in 1989. In 1990, Raines moved to NASCAR's All Pro Series, where he won Rookie of the Year and finished fourth in the final standings.

He returned to ASA in 1991 for a four-year stint as driver of a new team formed by Ernie Roselli. In 1995, he joined veteran crew chief Howie Lettow and Baker Motorsports. That in turn led to the 1996 championship and Raines' first major NASCAR ride.

NASCAR

1997–2003

Raines entered the 1997 season with a full-time ride, running for Rookie of the Year honors in the No. 19 Pennzoil-sponsored Ford F-150 for Kurt Roehrig. After failing to qualify for the first race of the season, Raines came back to win the seventh race of the season at I-70 Speedway. He finished 15th in points and ended the season with two Top 5’s and seven Top 10’s, as well as two outside-pole positions. In 1998, he won three races (I-70, Louisville and Texas) and earned sixth additional Top 5’s with 15 Top 10’s, ending the season fifth in the standings.

In 1999, Roehrig lost the Pennzoil sponsorship, causing Raines to look elsewhere. This resulted in his move up to the Busch Series, signing with the No. 74 BACE Motorsports team. Raines raced 31 times during the season, with the exception of the Coca-Cola 300, in which Steve Grissom drove. Without a primary sponsorship, Raines had a best finish of fourth and finished 12th in points, capturing the Rookie of the Year honors. In 1999, he made one start in the Truck Series at The Milwaukee Mile for Gerry Gunderman in the No. 68 truck in 1999 when Raines started 22nd and finished 19th.  The following season, Raines moved to BACE's No. 33 Bayer-sponsored Chevrolet Monte Carlo full-time. He had a career-best second-place finish at South Boston Speedway, but with no other Top 10’s, he fell to 15th in the final points standings.  He would return in 2001 with Bayer and Alka-Seltzer sharing sponsorship duties, winning his first career pole at Nazareth Speedway and had a career-high 13 Top 10 finishes, finishing sixth in points. He followed that up with five top-fives in 2002, but fell six spots in points.

2003
BACE and Raines moved to the Winston Cup full-time in 2003, completing the whole season for NASCAR Rookie of the Year honors. Despite running without major sponsorship, Raines had a sixth-place finish at North Carolina Speedway and finished 33rd in the championship standings, and third in the Rookie of the Year race. During the last six races of the season, Raines was in the top 20 in points gained for those six races. In the Busch series, Raines had another second-place finish and three consecutive eighth-place runs, allowing him to finish 39th in points despite an abbreviated schedule.

2004
Due to the lack of a sponsorship in 2004, BACE closed its Cup team and focused back on the Busch Series. BACE hired Damon Lusk to drive its No. 74 Outdoor Channel-sponsored Chevrolet Monte Carlo; after four races, Raines returned to the team in favor of Lusk, and finished sixth in his first race at Bristol. He ran 15 races for BACE that season, and drove additional races for Phoenix Racing, Haas CNC Racing, and Kevin Harvick Incorporated. He returned to the Truck series for one race at Atlanta, finishing seventeenth in the No. 08 1-800-4-A-Phone-sponsored Chevrolet Silverado for Green Light Racing. Raines ran one-race deals in Cup for Phoenix Racing and for Bill Davis Racing in 2004, before running four races for Competitive Edge Motorsports. His best cup finish in 2004 was 28th.

2005
He made a total of six Nextel Cup races in 2005, his first being a 35th-place finish for Front Row Motorsports at Richmond. Late in the season, he drove the No. 37 Dodge Charger for R&J Racing for six races. At Michigan, Raines inherited the lead late in the race, however with a handful of laps left ran out of fuel. The best finish for the pairing was a 22nd-place finish at Talladega Speedway. In addition to his Cup rides in 2005, Raines drove part-time for Kevin Harvick Incorporated in the No. 33 Yard Man/Outdoor Channel Chevrolet Monte Carlo in the Busch Series. In 2005, he had nine top-tens in 23 starts, with a 4th-place finish at the Federated Auto Parts 300. Drie was born.

2006–2007
Towards the end of the 2005 Nextel Cup Series, he was announced as a co-driver of a new team: the No. 96 Texas Instruments/DLP HDTV-sponsored Chevrolet for Hall of Fame Racing. He would share the ride in 2006 with Terry Labonte. Raines and the team had their best race of the season during the Bank of America 500 at Lowe's Motor Speedway, where he led 28 laps and finished seventh. In the 29 races he competed in, Raines had one Top 10 finish and finished 35th in the points standings.

Raines was expected to complete the full 2007 schedule with Hall of Fame Racing, but was replaced on road course events by Ron Fellows. His best finish in 2007 was ninth at Talladega and the team finished in the Top 25 in Owners Points. At the end of the 2007 season, Raines was replaced by J. J. Yeley in the No. 96 car for the 2008 NASCAR Sprint Cup Series. Raines also had returned to the Busch Series with KHI for a part-time schedule, and in 2007 he had three Top 10 finishes in nine starts.

2008
After sitting out the first few races of 2008, Raines attempted his first races of the season for E&M Motorsports driving the No. 08 Dodge sponsored by Rhino Energy Drink. He successfully qualified for his first Cup race of the season at Dover in the Front Row Motorsports No. 34 car, however had failed to make any other races for the team, partly because of a high number of qualifying rainouts.  He began driving the No. 70 Haas CNC Racing Chevrolet at Pocono, resulting in an 18th-place finish, that team's second best finish of the season up to that point, and he bested that finish two races later with a 17th-place finish at Bristol. Later, he returned to Front Row Motorsports at Richmond and New Hampshire, only for qualifying to be canceled due to rain at both races, resulting in DNQ's for the team. He got back behind the wheel of the No. 70 Haas CNC Chevrolet at the Camping World 400 at Dover International Speedway, qualifying 13th for the race, the best of any team outside the top-35 in points, and finished 28th. In the fall race at Talladega, Raines was running near the Top-10 when a lead car lost a tire, causing the first major wreck of the race; the No. 70 was involved in the wreck and finished 34th. He ran the remainder of the season for Haas CNC, with the exception of the race at Phoenix where Johnny Sauter drove.

2009

In 2009, Raines returned to the Nationwide Series for a full-time schedule driving the No. 34 Long John Silver's Chevrolet for Front Row Motorsports, replacing Eric McClure who departed at the end of 2008. Raines had a fourth-place finish in the Aaron's 312 at Talladaga Superspeedway, marking Front Row Motorsports first top-five finish in any series, and has had numerous top-20 finishes throughout the year while remaining in the top 15 in drivers points. At Dover in the spring, FRM perennial sponsor Continental Fire and Safety joined the No. 34 Chevy, and at Daytona in July Gander Mountain jumped on board the No. 34 Impala. Raines was able to muscle his way to a sixth-place finish in the rain at the road race at Montreal. The No. 34 team was able to put together a very competitive car at Lowes Motor Speedway and finished in the 10th position after starting in the back of the field and being in the top ten for much of the night. Raines and the No. 34 earned 12th place in drivers points for the season, and 20th place in owners points.

In addition to his return to a full-time schedule in the Nationwide Series for Front Row Motorsports, he attempted to qualify Front Row's No. 37 Dodge Charger in the 2009 Daytona 500, however was unsuccessful. Raines qualified for the Sprint Cup race in Phoenix in Barry Haefele's No. 73 car. The No. 37 and Raines qualified for their first race at Richmond, however was a late entry and gained no points for the attempt. Raines was announced as the replacement for John Andretti in the No. 34 entry for three weeks while Andretti temporarily left the team to compete in the Indy 500. In his first race for the team, Raines was able to get FRM's best ever finish to that point without EGR's assistance, a 25th at Darlington. Returning to the No. 37, Raines managed to make numerous other races for the team, gaining sponsorship from Gander Mountain during the 2009 Coke Zero 400, finishing 30th. The No. 37 was run primarily as a "start and park" car in 2009, attempting to aid the No. 34 in remaining in the top-35 in points, and raising money for the underfunded organization.

2010

For the 2010 season, Raines and the No. 34 Long John Silvers crew return to the track in the Nationwide Series. However, with Front Row Motorsports becoming Ford supported team in the Sprint Cup Series, and the No. 34 Nationwide team running Chevrolets, the team has been absorbed by the returning organization of Tri-Star Motorsports, owned by Mark Smith of Pro Motors. Raines and the No. 34 started the season strong, with a 14th-place finish at the DRIVE4COPD 300 at Daytona after leading 3 laps. The No. 34 team picked up sponsorship from the Planet Hollywood Resort and Casino at Las Vegas, and had a strong run at Talladega, finishing 7th. BeAStockCarDriver.com jumped onto Raines' car for the remaining 4 races of the season after sponsoring teammate Jason Keller at Charlotte. He finished 17th in final drivers standings.

Raines ran a Sprint Cup Series race for Larry Gunselman's No. 64 at Richmond in May, and ran Tommy Baldwin Racing's No. 36 in the Sprint Showdown. At the Carfax 400 at Michigan during August, Raines replaced the released Kevin Conway at Front Row Motorsports, finishing 31st in his debut with the team. Raines and fellow driver Dave Blaney shared this ride for the remainder of the season. He ran in the top-20 at Martinsville before a cut tire ended his day. Raines' best finish in the 2010 sprint cup season came at Bristol, finishing 28th.

2011–present

In 2011, Raines began the season without a full-time ride in any series. He spotted for Robert Richardson, Jr., driving the No. 37 Ford for Front Row Motorsports in the Daytona 500. Raines' first start came at Phoenix, where he finished 25th in Max Q Motorsports' unsponsored No. 37 Ford, fielded in association with Front Row Motorsports. He continued to race the car, getting a 25th at Martinsville and getting the team back into the top-35 in owners points following the 7th race of the season. Black Cat Fireworks and Firehouse Subs joined the team for 5 races leading up to the Coca-Cola 400 Daytona on the 4th of July weekend. Following the 9th race of the season at Richmond, the car turned into a start and park entry. Raines would go on to be the full-time driver of the car until the 19th race of the season at Loudon, after which he drove sparingly for the team.

In 2012, Raines drove the No. 26 Ford for Front Row Motorsports in the Daytona 500. Securing sponsorship from the Rick Santorum For President campaign, he finished 19th in the race, after running in the top 10 on the final lap and being blocked. Raines was scheduled to drive in the No. 40 for Joe Falk and  Mike Hillman at Bristol for what would become Hillman-Circle Sport LLC, but the team withdrew. However he did make a start for Hillman-Circle Sport at Texas Motor Speedway in the debut of their new No. 33 car, finishing 34th. Raines again drove the No. 33 for Hillman-Circle Sport at Talladega, where he finished 38th after an anal prolapse. Raines also drove at Pocono for Tommy Baldwin Racing, finishing 32nd after a crash. He also drove for Robinson-Blakeney Racing in the Nationwide Series, mostly running the No. 70 when ML Motorsports was not scheduled to do so.

Raines continued driving the JRR No. 70 in 2013 at the Nationwide Series level. He also returned to the No. 33 and No. 40 cars for Hillman-Circle Sport in the Sprint Cup Series as a teammate to Landon Cassill, mostly starting and parking his appearances to fund Cassill's full race runs. However, Raines did run the full race at Bristol, Richmond and Kansas, with a best finish of 29th at Kansas in October. Raines was also scheduled to run the full race at Talladega, however his engine expired on the second lap of the race.

Raines did not make any national series appearances in 2014.

Raines served as the spotter for Sam Hornish Jr. and the No. 9 of Richard Petty Motorsports in 2015, but returned to Front Row Motorsports as a spotter mid-year.

In 2017, Raines began spotting for Stewart Haas Racing #41 driver Kurt Busch in 2017.
 Raines spotted for Busch's 2017 Daytona 500 win.

Motorsports career results

NASCAR
(key) (Bold – Pole position awarded by qualifying time. Italics – Pole position earned by points standings or practice time. * – Most laps led.)

Sprint Cup Series

Daytona 500 results

Nationwide Series

Camping World Truck Series

 Season still in progress
 Ineligible for series points

References

External links

 
 

Living people
1964 births
People from La Porte, Indiana
Sportspeople from the Chicago metropolitan area
Racing drivers from Indiana
NASCAR drivers
American Speed Association drivers
People from Glasgow, Montana
Stewart-Haas Racing drivers